Robert Cornelius Nugent (September 18, 1915 – June 4, 1995) was an American professional basketball player. He played for the Syracuse Nationals in the National Basketball League during the 1946–47 season and averaged 3.5 points per game.

References

1915 births
1995 deaths
United States Army personnel of World War II
American men's basketball players
Basketball players from Syracuse, New York
Guards (basketball)
Syracuse Nationals players